El Dragón: Return of a Warrior, is a Spanish-language crime drama television series created by Arturo Pérez-Reverte for Televisa and Univision. The series premiered first in the United States on 30 September 2019 on Univision, and its first season ended on 22 November 2019 with a total of 38 episodes. While the second season premiered on 25 November 2019 only in the United States, and is scheduled to conclude on 20 January 2020.

Series overview

Episodes

Season 1 (2019)

Season 2 (2019–20)

References

External links
 

Lists of American drama television series episodes